Created By is a 1993 horror novel written by Richard Christian Matheson.

1993 American novels
1990s horror novels
American horror novels
Works by Richard Christian Matheson
Bantam Books books